Paul Dickey (12 May 1882 – 7 January 1933), was an American playwright and silent screen writer. He wrote 17 films between years 1914 and 1933.

He was born in Chicago, Illinois and died in New York, New York, aged 50.

Selected filmography as screen writer 
 The Ghost Breaker (1914) directed by Cecil B. DeMille 
 The Ghost Breaker (1922)
 Tin Gods (1926)
 Misleading Lady (1932)
 The Ghost Breakers (1940)

Filmography as actor 
 Robin Hood (1922)

External links 
 
 
 
 

1882 births
1933 deaths
American male screenwriters
Writers from Chicago
American male dramatists and playwrights
20th-century American dramatists and playwrights
20th-century American male writers
Screenwriters from Illinois
20th-century American screenwriters